The Kariba Dam is a double curvature concrete arch dam in the Kariba Gorge of the Zambezi river basin between Zambia and Zimbabwe.

Construction 
The dam was constructed on the orders of the Government of the Federation of Rhodesia and Nyasaland, a 'federal colony' within the British Empire. The double curvature concrete arch dam was designed by Coyne et Bellier and constructed between 1955 and 1959 by Impresit of Italy at a cost of $135,000,000 for the first stage with only the Kariba South power cavern. Final construction and the addition of the Kariba North Power cavern by Mitchell Construction was not completed until 1977 due to largely political problems for a total cost of $480,000,000. During construction, 86 men lost their lives.

The dam was officially opened by Queen Elizabeth The Queen Mother on 17 May 1960.

Power generation 
Each country has its own power station on the north and south bank of the dam respectively.

On November 11, 2013 it was announced by Zimbabwe's Finance Minister, Patrick Chinamasa that capacity at the Zimbabwean (South) Kariba hydropower station would be increased by 300 megawatts. The cost of upgrading the facility has been supported by a $319m loan from China. The deal is a clear example of Zimbabwe's "Look East" policy, which was adopted after falling out with Western powers. Construction on the Kariba South expansion began in mid-2014 and was initially expected to be complete in 2019.

In March 2018, president Emmerson Mnangagwa commissioned the completed expansion of Kariba South Hydroelectric Power Station. The expansion work was done by Sinohydro, at a cost of US$533 million. Work started in 2014, and was completed in March 2018.

Two additional 180 MW generators were added.

Location 

The Kariba Dam project was planned and carried out by the Government of the Federation of Rhodesia and Nyasaland. The Federation was often referred to as the Central African Federation (CAF). The CAF was a 'federal colony' within the British Empire in southern Africa that existed from 1953 to the end of 1963, comprising the former self-governing British colony of Southern Rhodesia and the former British protectorates of Northern Rhodesia and Nyasaland. Northern Rhodesia had decided earlier in 1953 (before the Federation was founded) to build a dam within its territory, on the Kafue River, a major tributary of the Zambezi. It would have been closer to Northern Rhodesia's Copperbelt, which was in need of more power. This would have been a cheaper and less grandiose project, with a smaller environmental impact. Southern Rhodesia, the richest of the three, objected to a Kafue dam and insisted that the dam be sited instead at Kariba. Also, the capacity of the Kafue dam was much lower than that at Kariba. Initially the dam was managed and maintained by the Central African Power Corporation. The Kariba Dam is now owned and operated by the Zambezi River Authority, which is jointly and equally owned by Zimbabwe and Zambia.

Since Zambia's independence, three dams have been built on the Kafue River: the Kafue Gorge Upper Dam, Kafue Gorge Lower Dam and the Itezhi-Tezhi Dam.

Environmental impacts

Population displacement and resettlement 

The creation of the reservoir forced resettlement of about 57,000 Tonga people living along the Zambezi on both sides.  

There are many different perspectives on how much resettlement aid was given to the displaced Tonga. British author David Howarth described the efforts in Northern Rhodesia:

Anthropologist Thayer Scudder, who has studied these communities since the late 1950s, wrote:

American writer Jacques Leslie, in Deep Water (2005), focused on the plight of the people displaced by Kariba Dam, and found the situation little changed since the 1970s. In his view, Kariba remains the worst dam-resettlement disaster in African history.

Basilwizi Trust 

In an effort to regain control of their lives, the local people who were displaced by the Kariba dam's reservoir formed the Basilwizi Trust in 2002. The Trust seeks mainly to improve the lives of people in the area through organizing development projects and serving as a conduit between the people of the Zambezi Valley and their country's decision-making process.

River ecology 
The Kariba Dam controls 90% of the total runoff of the Zambezi River, thus changing the downstream ecology dramatically.

Wildlife rescue 
From 1958 to 1961, Operation Noah captured and removed around 6,000 large animals and numerous small ones threatened by the lake's rising waters.

Recent activity 
On 6 February 2008, the BBC reported that heavy rain could lead to a release of water from the dam, which would force 50,000 people downstream to evacuate.
Rising levels led to the opening of the floodgates in March 2010, requiring the evacuation of 130,000 people who lived in the floodplain, and causing concerns that flooding would spread to nearby areas.

In March 2014, at a conference organized by the Zambezi River Authority, engineers warned that the foundations of the dam had weakened and there was a possibility of dam failure unless repairs were made.

On 3 October 2014 the BBC reported that "The Kariba Dam is in a dangerous state. Opened in 1959, it was built on a seemingly solid bed of basalt. But, in the past 50 years, the torrents from the spillway have eroded that bedrock, carving a vast crater that has undercut the dam's foundations. … engineers are now warning that without urgent repairs, the whole dam will collapse. If that happened, a tsunami-like wall of water would rip through the Zambezi valley, reaching the Mozambique border within eight hours. The torrent would overwhelm Mozambique's Cahora Bassa Dam and knock out 40% of southern Africa's hydroelectric capacity. Along with the devastation of wildlife in the valley, the Zambezi River Authority estimates that the lives of 3.5 million people are at risk."

In June 2015 The Institute of Risk Management South Africa completed a Risk Research Report entitled Impact of the failure of the Kariba Dam. It concluded: "Whilst we can debate whether the Kariba
Dam will fail, why it might occur and when, there is no doubt that the impact across the region would be devastating."

In January 2016 it was reported that water levels at the dam had dropped to 12% of capacity. Low rainfalls and overuse of the water by the power plants have left the reservoir near empty, raising the prospect that both Zimbabwe and Zambia will face water shortages.

In July and September 2018, The Lusaka Times reported that work had started relating to the plunge pool and cracks in the dam wall.

On 22 February 2019 Bloomberg reported "Zambia has reduced hydropower production at the Kariba Dam because of rapidly declining water levels" but "Zambia doesn't anticipate power cuts as a result of shortages". On 5 August that year, the same publication reported that the reservoir was near empty, and that it may have to stop hydropower production.

As of November 2020 the water level in the Kariba reservoir has remained steady around the 25% capacity, up from nearly half that in November 2019. The Zambezi River Authority has stated that it is optimistic about rainfall estimates for the 2020/2021 rainfall season, allocating an increased amount of water for power production. As it sits now, the reservoir is holding 15.77 billion cubic meters of water, with the water line sitting at around 478.30 metres (1,569.23 ft), just above the minimum capacity for power generation of 475.50 metres (1,560.04 ft).

It was reported in February 2022 that rehabilitation work has been underway since 2017 on the Kariba dam. The Zambezi River Authority (ZRA) said that work on the Kariba Dam Rehabilitation Project (KDRP), which includes efforts to reconfigure the plunge pool and rebuild the spillway gates, is scheduled to be finished in 2025. The rehabilitation of the dam is being financed by the European Union (EU), the World Bank, the Swedish government and the African Development Bank (AfDB), with the Zambian and Zimbabwe governments contributing counterpart funding. The project’s goal is to guarantee the structural integrity of the Kariba Dam, assuring the sustained generation of power primarily for the benefit of the inhabitants of Zimbabwe and Zambia and the broader Southern African Development Community area. The work on redesigning the plunge pool involves bulk excavating the rock in the current pool to assist plunge pool stabilization and avoid additional scouring or erosion along the weak fault zone towards the dam foundation. This reshaping work will be accomplished by constructing a temporary water-tight cofferdam to complete the reshaping work under dry conditions.

See also 

 Cahora Bassa Dam
 Nyami Nyami
 List of largest power stations in the world
 List of crossings of the Zambezi River

References

External links 

Dams in Zambia
Dams in Zimbabwe
Lake Kariba
Zambezi River
Arch dams
Buildings and structures in Mashonaland West Province
Dams completed in 1959
1959 establishments in Northern Rhodesia
1959 establishments in Southern Rhodesia
1959 establishments in Africa
Tourist attractions in Zambia
Tourist attractions in Zimbabwe
Rhodesia–Zambia relations
Zambia–Zimbabwe border

sr:Кариба (језеро)